Entreprenant or Entreprenante may refer to:

 Entreprenant (1965), port tug
 French ship Entreprenant or Entreprante: several ships of the Navy of France by the name
 HMS Entreprenante (1799)

See also
 HMS Enterprise (1705), formerly L'Entreprise